The Brandsbutt Stone is a class I Pictish symbol stone in Inverurie, Aberdeenshire, Scotland.

Description
The stone, now reassembled, bears two incised Pictish symbols, a crescent and v-rod and a serpent and z-rod, and an inscription in Ogham, IRATADDOARENS. The carvings of the Brandsbutt Stone are dated to around AD 600. It is a scheduled monument.

Inscription 

The inscription borne by the Brandsbutt Stone, IRATADDOARENS, has been described by Katherine Forsyth as appearing to be "utterly baffling". However, a handful of interpretations have been offered. Suggestions include the possibility that it may contain a corrupted version of the personal name Ethernan. If this is the case, it is likely to refer to the 7th century saint Ethernan about whom little is known but who was apparently venerated by the Picts. He is referred to in an entry from the Annals of Ulster from 669 AD as having been killed by the Picts along with Corindu. It is thought that these names may be P-Celtic and therefore Pictish in origin.

Other examples of the name Ethernan being preserved on Pictish stones include, in Ogham, The Newton Stone (IDDARRNNN), Rodney's Stone (EDDARRNON) and The Scoonie Stone (EDDARRNONN), and, in Latin script, The Fordoun Stone (PIDARNOIN).

The ira- may be a Pictish verb cognate with Breton irha meaning "he lies". However, the existence of this verb is doubtful, according to Rodway.

Thomas Clancy proposed that the text represents the Gaelic phrase i rath Aduarén s- meaning "this is the property of Aduarén here".

References

External links
Entry in Canmore database

Pictish stones
Pictish stones in Aberdeenshire
Scheduled Ancient Monuments in Aberdeenshire
Inverurie